The Markham Economist & Sun is a local newspaper published once per week (Thursday)  serving the city of Markham, Ontario, Canada. The Economist & Sun is one of several York Region Media Group newspapers, a division of Metroland Media Group.

Coverage
The Economist & Sun is a local newspaper: it covers local news and sports, and carried real estate and classified advertising.

History
In 1856, David Reesor founded the Markham Economist. Reesor sold the paper to his brother-in-law Henry Ryan Corson, who became the paper's second publisher in 1860.

The Economists rival was the Markham Sun. The Sun was founded (or taken over) by George James Chauncey (1849-1895) in 1881 and became the rival to Reesor's paper. The Sun was bought by the Economist in 1915, creating the Economist & Sun. Corson's son Robert J. Corson was publisher of the new paper until his death in 1930. Metroland Media Group now owns the company.

Operations
 Publisher: Dana Robbins
 Editor: Lee Ann Waterman

See also
Metroland Media Group
List of newspapers in Canada

References

External links
Markham Economist & Sun
Metroland Media Group corporate site

Weekly newspapers published in Ontario
Publications established in 1856
Markham, Ontario
Mass media in the Regional Municipality of York
1856 establishments in Ontario